Don Pachi  may refer to:

DonPachi is the name of a popular, early bullet hell video game
Don Pachi is also the name of a major character in the anime Bobobo-bo Bo-bobo